Aberdeen F.C. competed in the Scottish Premier Division, Scottish Cup, League Cup and European Cup Winners' Cup in season 1982–83. They finished third in the Premier Division behind champions Dundee United and runners-up Celtic. In the cups, they retained the Scottish Cup and won the European Cup Winners' Cup with a 2–1 win over Real Madrid in Gothenburg.

Results

Friendlies

In late July/early August 1982, Aberdeen played three games against Highland League opposition. On 7 August, English club Ipswich Town provided the opposition for Drew Jarvie's testimonial game, which the English League Division 1 club won 1–0.

Scottish Premier Division

Final standings

Scottish League Cup

Group stage

Group 2 final table

Knockout stage

Scottish Cup

European Cup Winners' Cup

After winning the Scottish Cup in 1982, Aberdeen qualified for the 1982–83 European Cup Winners' Cup. After a large preliminary round victory over Sion of Switzerland, the Dons knocked out Dinamo Tirana of Albania and Lech Poznan of Poland to set up a quarter final tie with the West Germans Bayern Munich. After a 0–0 draw in Munich, Aberdeen fell behind early on at home in the second leg before Neil Simpson equalised. Another goal for Bayern Munich seemed to put the game beyond Aberdeen, but two quick goals in the last 20 minutes gave Aberdeen a 3–2 victory. In the semi finals, Belgian team Waterschei of Genk were beaten 5–2 over two legs, and put Aberdeen into the final. Thousands of fans made the trip from Aberdeen to Gothenburg in Sweden to see the Scottish Cup holders play the Spaniards Real Madrid. In a wet evening at the Ullevi Stadium, Aberdeen won 2–1 after extra time to win their first European trophy.

Squad

Appearances & Goals

|}

References

 

Aberdeen F.C. seasons
Aberdeen
UEFA Cup Winners' Cup-winning seasons